Jaroslav Votruba (born 1 April 1939) is a Czech former pair skater who competed for Czechoslovakia. With skating partner Milada Kubíková, he placed 5th at two World Championships and 10th at the 1964 Winter Olympics in Innsbruck, Austria.

Life and career
Votruba was born on 1 April 1939 in Plzeň, Czechoslovakia. He teamed up with Milada Kubíková by the 1958–59 season.

The pair placed seventh at their first major event, the 1962 European Championships in Geneva, Switzerland, and then fifth at the 1962 World Championships in Prague, Czechoslovakia.

Kubíková/Votruba had their best season in 1962–63. They placed 5th at the 1963 European Championships in Budapest, Hungary, and achieved the same result at the 1963 World Championships in Cortina d'Ampezzo, Italy.

Kubíková/Votruba finished 12th at the 1964 European Championships in Grenoble, France, and 10th at the 1964 Winter Olympics in Innsbruck, Austria.

Czechoslovak authorities destroyed footage of Kubíková/Votruba's performances following her defection, although Votruba stayed. The pair was named one of Plzeň's ten "Sport Stars of the 20th Century" at a gala on February 17, 2001.

Competitive highlights 
With Kubíková

References 

1939 births
Czech male pair skaters
Czechoslovak male pair skaters
Living people
Sportspeople from Plzeň
Figure skaters at the 1964 Winter Olympics
Olympic figure skaters of Czechoslovakia